Zhang Yizhi (張易之; died February 20, 705), formally the Duke of Heng (恆公), nickname Wulang (五郎) and Zhang Changzong (張昌宗; died February 20, 705), formally the Duke of Ye (鄴公), nickname Liulang (六郎), were two brothers who served as officials of Wu Zetian's Zhou Dynasty and became very powerful late in her reign. Both brothers were killed in a coup that overthrew Wu Zetian in 705.

Background 
It is not known when Zhang Yizhi and Zhang Changzong were born. It is known that their father Zhang Xizang (張希臧) had, at one point, served as the census officer of Tang Dynasty's capital prefecture Yong Prefecture (雍州, roughly modern Xi'an, Shaanxi) and was a distant nephew of the chancellor Zhang Xingcheng.  Their mother might be Lady Wei or Lady Zang.

As per Tang regulations, Zhang Yizhi, as the son of an official, was able to get into a civil service career himself in his 20s, serving as the imperial director of horses (尚乘奉御, Shangcheng Fengyu). It was said that his skin at that time was white and beautiful and that he was good at singing.

As Wu Zetian's lover 
In 697, Zhang Changzong was referred to Wu Zetian, then ruling with the title of emperor—the only woman in the history of China recognized for doing so—by Wu Zetian's daughter Princess Taiping, to be Wu Zetian's lover. Zhang Changzong further told Wu Zetian that Zhang Yizhi was even more skillful than he was, and so Wu Zetian took Zhang Yizhi as a lover as well. Both were repeatedly promoted—Zhang Yizhi as the deputy minister of military supplies (司衛少卿, Siwei Shaoqing)—and both were said to often put makeup on their faces and dressing in a beautiful manner. Their mother or mothers were given titles as grand ladies and Wu Zetian further ordered the chancellor Li Jiongxiu to serve as the lover for one of them. Even the most powerful officials flattered them, and referred them by endearing nicknames—Zhang Yizhi as Wulang and Zhang Changzong as Liulang (implying that Zhang Yizhi was the fifth-born son and Zhang Changzong was the sixth-born son of Zhang Xizang).

In 698, Zhang Yizhi and Zhang Changzong were involved in the recall from exile of Wu Zetian's son Li Zhe the Prince of Luling, who had briefly been emperor in 684. The Zhangs' colleague as imperial attendant, Ji Xu, had persuaded them that they were becoming objects of hatred due to the favor that Wu Zetian had shown for them and that if they advocated Li Zhe's return and installation as crown prince, they would be able to maintain their power. The Zhangs agreed and advocated Li Zhe's return to Wu Zetian, who subsequently recalled Li Zhe from exile and made him crown prince.

In 699, Zhang Yizhi was made the director of imperial attendants (控鶴監, Konghe Jian), overseeing a group of imperial attendants, including Zhang Changzong, Ji, Tian Guidao (田歸道), Li Jiongxiu, Xue Ji and Yuan Banqian (員半千).

In 700, Zhang Yizhi was on one occasion offended by the official Yang Yuanxi (楊元禧)—a grandnephew of the Sui Dynasty chancellor Yang Su, who had been believed to be involved with Emperor Yang of Sui in killing Emperor Yang's father Emperor Wen of Sui. Zhang Yizhi retaliated against Yang Yuanxi by arguing to Wu Zetian that family members of Yang Su should not be allowed to serve in the capital, and Wu Zetian agreed, demoting Yang Yuanxi and his brother Yang Yuanheng (楊元亨) out of the capital Luoyang.

Also in 700, in order to somewhat shield her relationship with the Zhangs from the public eye, Wu Zetian commissioned them and the imperial scholar Li Jiao to compile a work known as the Essence of Pearls from the Three Religions (三教珠英, Sanjiao Zhuying)—a compilation of various poetry about Confucianism, Buddhism, and Taoism—to give the Zhangs a legitimate reason to enter the palace.

By 701, Wu Zetian, then 76 years old, had been largely entrusting the affairs of state to Zhang Yizhi and Zhang Changzong—a situation that her grandson Li Chongrun (son of Li Zhe, who had by now changed his name to Xian) disapproved and had discussed with his sister Li Xianhui the Lady Yongtai and Li Xianhui's husband, Wu Zetian's grandnephew Wu Yanji (武延基) the Prince of Wei.  When the Zhangs became aware of the conversation, they reported this to Wu Zetian, who saw this discussion as an implicit criticism of herself, and she ordered Li Chongrun, Li Xianhui, and Wu Yanji to commit suicide.

In 702, Wu Zetian induced Li Zhe, his younger brother Li Dan the Prince of Xiang, and Princess Taiping to submit formal petitions to create Zhang Changzong a prince.  Wu Zetian formally rejected the petitions, but then created Zhang Changzong the Duke of Ye and Zhang Yizhi the Duke of Heng.

By 703, the Zhangs were displeased with the chancellor Wei Yuanzhong, as Wei had repeatedly rebuffed the promotion of their brother Zhang Changqi (張昌期) and had publicly humiliated another brother, Zhang Changyi (張昌儀).  When Wu Zetian suffered a minor illness, the Zhangs became concerned that if Wu Zetian had died, they would be killed by Wei, and therefore falsely accused Wei and a favorite of Princess Taiping, Gao Jian (高戩), of having speculated about Wu Zetian's death.  They persuaded the official Zhang Shuo to falsely corroborate the accusations against Wei, although, once Zhang Shuo was brought into Wu Zetian's presence, he not only recanted the accusation against Wei but further accused the Zhangs of suborning perjury from him.  As a result, Wei, Gao, and Zhang Shuo were all exiled, but none of the three suffered death.  Zhang Yizhi further accused eight people who held a send-off feast for Wei of treason, but was not successful in getting the eight men executed.

In 704, Zhang Yizhi was accused of corruption, and as a result of the investigation, Zhang Changyi and another brother, Zhang Tongxiu (張同休), were removed from their offices.  The imperial censor Song Jing, who had long resented the Zhangs, volunteered to investigate Zhang Yizhi and Zhang Changzong, and Wu Zetian publicly agreed, but then sent Song out of the capital to investigate Qutu Zhongxiang (屈突仲翔) the commandant at You Prefecture (幽州, roughly modern Beijing), giving the case instead to the minister of ceremonies, Cui Shenqing (崔神慶), who knew that she wanted them spared, and therefore cleared them.

Death 
By early 705, Wu Zetian was seriously ill, and the chancellor Zhang Jianzhi, believing that the Zhangs' power threatened Li Xian's succession, entered into a coup plot with the other officials Cui Xuanwei, Jing Hui, Huan Yanfan, and Yuan Shuji.  They rose on February 20 and went to see Li Xian and, after receiving his assent, took their forces into the palace and killed Zhang Yizhi and Zhang Changzong at Yingxian Courtyard (迎仙院); their brothers Zhang Changqi, Zhang Tongxiu, and Zhang Changyi were also killed, and the five men's heads were hung at Tianjin Bridge (天津橋), one of the entries to Luoyang.  The officials then forced Wu Zetian to yield the throne to Li Xian (as Emperor Zhongzong), ending Zhou Dynasty and restoring Tang Dynasty.

In 750, during the reign of Wu Zetian's grandson Emperor Xuanzong, Zhang Changqi's daughter submitted a petition defending her father and uncles.  With assistance by her cousin, the chancellor Yang Guozhong (whose mother was a sister of the Zhang brothers'), her petition was accepted by Emperor Xuanzong, and he posthumously restored the Zhang brothers' titles.

Notes

References

 Old Book of Tang, vol. 78.
 New Book of Tang, vol. 104.
 Zizhi Tongjian, vols. 206, 207.

Tang dynasty politicians
Tang dynasty generals
705 deaths
Chinese spiritual writers
Tang dynasty writers
7th-century births
Wu Zetian